= Erlongquan =

Erlongquan, a martial art from Shandong and Hebei, is one of the schools of Chinese martial arts and a branch of Shaolin martial arts.

== Lineage ==
Erlongquan originated during the Hongwu period of the Ming Dynasty and became popular in the late Qing Dynasty. There are different explanations for the name: one suggests it was named after the Erlang God, while another says it was created by two Shaolin disciples, Wei Yiguang and Kong Yiming, and thus named Erlongquan. The style was passed down mainly in northern China, particularly in areas such as Hebei and Shandong.

== Introduction ==
Erlongquan's unarmed forms include the Three-Step Stance, Four-Step Stance, Tongshou (Connecting Hands), Nine-Duan Hand, Twenty Legs, and Twelve Routes of Tan Legs, among others. The characteristics of the style lie in its straightforward and efficient strikes, with techniques that emphasize pressing, chopping, lifting, and cutting, as well as leaping, hugging, dodging, and expanding in the shape of the 八字 (eight characters or 八卦). In close combat, the fists strike in a way that resembles the "卧牛" (lying cow) position, while in open combat, the strikes cover all directions.

The movements are simple, clear, and unadorned, focusing on a balance of hardness and softness. The footwork is flexible and diverse, with an emphasis on adaptability and fluidity in execution.
